Dick Lee (born 1956) is a Singaporean pop singer, composer and playwright.

Dick Lee may also refer to:
 Dick Lee (Australian footballer) (1889–1968), Australian rules footballer
 Dick Lee (footballer, born 1944), English footballer
 Dick Lee (basketball), American basketball player and public relations worker
 Dick Lee Ming-kwai (born 1950), former Commissioner of Hong Kong Police

See also
 Richard Lee (disambiguation)
 Dickey Lee (born 1936), American singer